Wife (1975) is a novel by Bharati Mukherjee.

Plot summary
This is the story of Dimple Dasgupta who has an arranged marriage to Amit Basu, an engineer, instead of marrying a neurosurgeon as she had dreamed about. They move to the United States and experience culture shock and loneliness.  At one point, she jumps rope to escape her pregnancy.  As frustration becomes expressed as abuse, the tale turns to tragedy with the murder of her husband, Amit at the end.

Publication history
 Hardcover – , published in 1975 by Houghton Mifflin
 Paperback – , published by Fawcett Crest

External links
Book review

1975 American novels
Novels by Bharati Mukherjee
Novels set in India
Novels set in Queens, New York
Houghton Mifflin books
Indian-American culture